Tetsuya Tani (谷 哲也, born July 9, 1985 in Tokushima, Tokushima, Japan) is a Japanese former professional baseball infielder in Japan's Nippon Professional Baseball. He played for the Chunichi Dragons from 2009 to 2018.

External links

1985 births
Living people
Baseball people from Tokushima Prefecture
People from Tokushima (city)
Japanese expatriate baseball players in the Dominican Republic
Nippon Professional Baseball infielders
Chunichi Dragons players
Estrellas Orientales players